is a Japanese former footballer and current manager of Kamatamare Sanuki. His son, Jin Uenoyama, played for FC Osaka before retiring at the end of 2020.

Managerial statistics

References

1957 births
Living people
Sportspeople from Osaka Prefecture
Association football people from Osaka Prefecture
Japanese footballers
Japan Soccer League players
Cerezo Osaka players
J3 League managers
Kamatamare Sanuki managers
Japanese football managers
Association football defenders